Adventure in Sahara is a 1938 American adventure film directed by D. Ross Lederman and starring Paul Kelly.

Cast
 Paul Kelly as Jim Wilson
 C. Henry Gordon as Capt. Savatt
 Lorna Gray as Carla Preston
 Robert Fiske as Lt. Dumond
 Marc Lawrence as Poule
 Dick Curtis as Karnoldi
 Stanley Brown as René Malreaux
 Al Bridge as Cpl. Dronov (as Alan Bridge)
 Ray Bennett as Ladoux (as Raphael Bennett)
 Charles R. Moore as Gungadin (as Charles Moore)
 Dwight Frye as Gravet, 'the Jackal'
 Stanley Andrews as Col. Rancreux

References

External links
 

1938 films
1938 adventure films
American adventure films
1930s English-language films
American black-and-white films
Films directed by D. Ross Lederman
French Foreign Legion in popular culture
Films set in deserts
Columbia Pictures films
Films about the French Foreign Legion
1930s American films